Forder is a surname. Notable people with the surname include:

Anna Forder (born 1951), Canadian pair skater
Charles Forder (1907-2008), British Anglican archdeacon
Damian Forder (born 1979), British cricketer
Henry Forder (1889–1981), New Zealand mathematician
James Forder (born 1964), British economist
Robert Forder (1884-1901), English publisher and bookseller